Gordon "Bumper" Clifford Taylor (24 October 1915 – 27 June 2009) was a Royal Navy chaplain, Anglican priest, author and clergyman, who served as a priest for more than fifty years.

Early life
Taylor was born in Wigan on 24 October 1915. He wished to become a chaplain as early as age 18, but was rejected as too young. He went to Christ's College to study geography and English. He took Holy Orders after studying at Ripon Hall, University of Oxford where he rejected "liberal theology".

Church and Royal Navy service
After graduation he was ordained by Arthur Winnington-Ingram at St. Paul's Cathedral in 1938. He then became a curate at St. Stephen's Ealing. In 1940, he volunteered to become a chaplain in the Royal Navy, and was initially disappointed to be assigned to the stone frigate and former Butlins located at Skegness summer camp , where new recruits were processed and trained in the Royal Navy. During that time, he buried several men killed by a Luftwaffe air raid. In 1941, he was posted aboard , which was assigned to Atlantic convoy until he was injured in a fall that damaged his scaphoid bone. After his treatment, he was assigned to South America. He also spent time at two shore assignments, once in Nairobi, where he got permission to build a church by beating the commanding officer at snooker. He was then assigned to convoy duty escorting ships into Murmansk.

Later life
Upon demobilization in 1946, Taylor became an assistant master at Eton College. In 1978 he wrote "The Sea Chaplains", which is now the standard history of Royal Navy chaplains. This was followed in 1983 by "London's Navy : a story of the Royal Naval Volunteer Reserve". He died on 27 June 2009, aged 93.

Notes

References

 Obituary: The Reverend Gordon Taylor

1915 births
2009 deaths
20th-century English Anglican priests
Royal Navy chaplains
English military chaplains
World War II chaplains